Slovenia participated in the Eurovision Song Contest 2007 with the song "Cvet z juga" written by Andrej Babić. The song was performed by Alenka Gotar. Slovenian broadcaster Radiotelevizija Slovenija (RTV Slovenija) organised the national final EMA 2007 in order to select the Slovenian entry for the 2007 contest in Helsinki, Finland. The national final consisted of two semi-finals and a final where the winner was selected over two rounds of public voting. The top two entries in the first round competed in the second round where "Cvet z juga" performed by Alenka Gotar was eventually selected as the winner.

Slovenia competed in the semi-final of the Eurovision Song Contest which took place on 10 May 2007. Performing during the show in position 25, "Cvet z juga" was announced among the top 10 entries of the semi-final and therefore qualified to compete in the final on 12 May. This marked the first time that Slovenia qualified to the final of the Eurovision Song Contest from a semi-final since the introduction of semi-finals in 2004. It was later revealed that Slovenia placed seventh out of the 28 participating countries in the semi-final with 140 points. In the final, Slovenia performed in position 7 and placed fifteenth out of the 24 participating countries, scoring 66 points.

Background 

Slovenia's highest placing in the contest, to this point, has been seventh place, which the nation achieved on two occasions: in 1995 with the song "Prisluhni mi" performed by Darja Švajger and in 2001 with the song "Energy" performed by Nuša Derenda. The country's only other top ten result was achieved in 1997 when Tanja Ribič performing "Zbudi se" placed tenth. Since the introduction of semi-finals to the format of the contest in 2004, Slovenia had yet to manage to qualify to the final on one occasion. In 2006, "Mr Nobody" performed by Anžej Dežan failed to qualify to the final.

The Slovenian national broadcaster, Radiotelevizija Slovenija (RTV Slovenija), broadcasts the event within Slovenia and organises the selection process for the nation's entry. RTV Slovenija confirmed Slovenia's participation in the 2007 Eurovision Song Contest on 27 October 2006. The Slovenian entry for the Eurovision Song Contest has traditionally been selected through a national final entitled Evrovizijska Melodija (EMA), which has been produced with variable formats. For 2007, the broadcaster opted to organise EMA 2007 to select the Slovenian entry.

Before Eurovision

EMA 2007 
EMA 2007 was the 12th edition of the Slovenian national final format Evrovizijska Melodija (EMA). The competition was used by RTV Slovenija to select Slovenia's entry for the Eurovision Song Contest 2007. The 2007 edition of EMA took place at the Gospodarsko razstavišče in Ljubljana and consisted of three shows: two semi-finals and a final. The competition was broadcast on TVS 1 and online via the broadcaster's website rtvslo.si.

Format 
Twenty-four songs competed in three televised shows consisting of two semi-finals on 1 and 2 February 2007 and a final on 3 February 2007. Twelve songs competed in each semi-final with public televoting exclusively selecting seven finalists out of the twelve songs to proceed to the final. In the final, the winner was selected over two rounds of public televoting. In the first round, two out of the fourteen competing songs were selected to proceed to a superfinal. In the superfinal, the winner was determined.

Competing entries 
Artists and composers were able to submit their entries to the broadcaster between 27 November 2006 and 3 December 2006. 91 entries were received by the broadcaster during the submission period. An expert committee consisting of Miša Čermak (lyricist), Alenka Godec (singer), Vojko Sfiligoj (musician and composer) and Patrik Greblo (conductor and composer) selected twenty-three artists and songs for the competition from the received submissions, while an additional entry was provided by Eva Černe, the third season's winner of the talent show Bitka Talentov, who was directly invited by RTV Slovenija for the competition. The competing artists were announced on 12 December 2006.

Shows

Semi-final 1 
The first semi-final of EMA 2007 took place on 1 February 2007, hosted by Bernarda Žarn and Peter Poles. In addition to the performances of the competing entries, 2001 Slovenian Eurovision entrant Nuša Derenda, 2006 Slovenian Eurovision entrant Anžej Dežan and Eroica performed as guests. A public vote selected seven entries to proceed to the final.

Semi-final 2 
The second semi-final of EMA 2007 took place on 2 February 2007, hosted by Mojca Mavec and Gorazd Dominko. In addition to the performances of the competing entries, Saša Lendero and Pepel in kri performed as guests. A public vote selected seven entries to proceed to the final.

Final 
The final of EMA 2007 took place on 3 February 2007, hosted by Helena Blagne and Mario Galunič. In addition to the performances of the competing entries, 1997 Eurovision winner as part of Katrina and the Waves Katrina Leskanich, 2006 Bosnian Eurovision entrant Hari Mata Hari, Jan Plestenjak, Jure Godler, Rožmarinke and Heleno Blagne performed as guests. The winner was selected over two rounds of public voting. In the first round, the top two entries were selected to proceed to the second round, where "Cvet z juga" performed by Alenka Gotar was selected as the winner.

Promotion 
Alenka Gotar made several appearances across Europe to specifically promote "Cvet z juga" as the Slovenian Eurovision entry. On 24 and 25 February, Alenka Gotar performed during the final of the Spanish Eurovision national final Misión Eurovisión 2007. The following day, she performed during the Montenegrin Eurovision national final MontenegroSong 2007. On 1 March, Gotar performed during the Bosnian song presentation show BH Eurosong 2007. On 7 March, Gotar performed during the semi-final of the Serbian Eurovision national final Beovizija 2007. Between 3 and 7 April, Gotar completed promotional activities in Croatia and Macedonia where she made appearances on television programmes and talk shows.

At Eurovision

According to Eurovision rules, all nations with the exceptions of the host country, the "Big Four" (France, Germany, Spain and the United Kingdom) and the ten highest placed finishers in the 2006 contest are required to qualify from the semi-final on 10 May 2007 in order to compete for the final on 12 May 2007. On 12 March 2007, a special allocation draw was held which determined the running order for the semi-final. As one of the five wildcard countries, Slovenia chose to perform in position 25, following the entry from Belgium and before the entry from Turkey.

In Slovenia, the semi-final and the final were televised on RTV Slovenija with commentary by Mojca Mavec. The Slovenian spokesperson, who announced the Slovenian votes during the final, was Peter Poles.

Semi-final 
Alenka Gotar took part in technical rehearsals on 4 and 6 May, followed by dress rehearsals on 9 and 10 May. The Slovenian performance featured Alenka Gotar performing in a black and white shredded gown, joined by five backing vocalists on stage. Gotar also held white LED lights in her hands, representing the white flower of the south, of which she shone on her face during the performance. The stage colours were neon blue and the LED screens displayed a classical background superimposed by large sun symbols. The five backing vocalists that joined Alenka Gotar were: Amira Hidić, the co-composer of "Cvet z juga" Andrej Babić, Martina Majerle, Polona Furlan and Rudi Bučar.

At the end of the show, Slovenia was announced as having finished in the top ten and subsequently qualifying for the grand final. This marked the first time that Slovenia qualified to the final of the Eurovision Song Contest from a semi-final since the introduction of semi-finals in 2004. It was later revealed that the Slovenia placed seventh in the semi-final, receiving a total of 140 points.

Final 
The draw for the running order for the final was done by the presenters during the announcement of the ten qualifying countries during the semi-final and Slovenia was drawn to perform in position 7, following the entry from Macedonia and before the entry from Hungary. Alenka Gotar once again took part in dress rehearsals on 11 and 12 May before the final and Gotar performed a repeat of her semi-final performance during the final on 12 May. Slovenia placed fifteenth in the final, scoring 66 points.

Voting 
Below is a breakdown of points awarded to Slovenia and awarded by Slovenia in the semi-final and grand final of the contest. The nation awarded its 12 points to Serbia in the semi-final and the final of the contest.

Points awarded to Slovenia

Points awarded by Slovenia

References

2007
Countries in the Eurovision Song Contest 2007
Eurovision